Emma Talbot (born 1969, Stourbridge, Worcestershire) is an English artist who lives and works in Walthamstow, London.

Talbot studied at the Birmingham Institute of Art and Design graduating with a BA Fine Art at (1991), followed by studies at the Royal College of Art, where she obtained an MA in Painting  (1995), she was then a Rome Scholar at the British School at Rome (1996).

In 2006 Talbot was widowed and has said that this experience influenced the nature of her work. In 2020 she won the Max Mara Art Prize for Women with a project based on the painting of Three Ages of Woman by Gustav Klimt, which is in the Galleria Nazionale of Modern Art in Rome.

References

External links 
 
 

1969 births
Living people
20th-century English women artists
21st-century English women artists
20th-century English painters
21st-century English painters
Alumni of the Birmingham School of Art
Alumni of the Royal College of Art
English contemporary artists
English women painters
People from Stourbridge